The Viper engine is a high-performance naturally-aspirated pushrod 2 valves-per-cylinder 90° V10 engine designed by Chrysler but with aluminum block castings designed by Lamborghini for use in the Dodge Viper. Despite its large displacement, it is based on the Chrysler LA V8.

Development

Phase SR (1992–2002)

SR I (1st generation)
The Viper V10 is based on the Chrysler LA engine family and appeared with the Dodge Viper in 1992.

SR II (2nd generation)
There was a emissions transition happening around this time that may have influenced this.

Phase ZB (2003–2010)

ZB I (3rd generation)

ZB II (4th generation)
The bore was now , the same as Chrysler's 6.1 L Hemi engine.

Phase VX (2012–2017)

VX I (5th generation)
The 2013 SRT Viper kept roughly the same displacement but further boosted power to  @ 6150 rpm and  @ 4950 rpm of torque.

Other Viper V10 vehicles 

In addition, the Viper V10 was installed in the Dodge Ram SRT-10, earning the truck the Guinness World Record for fastest production truck (later bettered by the Australian Holden HSV Maloo, which uses the LS2, Corvette engine). The Dodge Tomahawk concept vehicle also uses this engine. Bitter Cars of Germany produced the Bitter GT1 based on the Lotus Elise GT1 using this engine.

Bristol Cars further produced a Fighter S, in which the engine was tuned to give  ( at high speed). Bristol had also planned to produce a Fighter T, further modifying the engine with a turbocharger to produce  at 5600 rpm, however Bristol have since stated that no Fighter T models were produced.

 Bristol Fighter
 Dodge Tomahawk 
 Millyard Viper V10
 Spania GTA Spano
 VLF Force 1
 Dodge Ram SRT-10
 Alfa Romeo Zagato TZ3 Stradale

References 

Chrysler engines
V10 engines